Ion Gonța (born 22 October 1978, in Chișinău) is a Moldovan light middleweight boxer based in Chişinău. His record stands at 17 wins, 2 losses and 2 draws after 17 bouts.

References

External links
 

1978 births
Living people
Sportspeople from Chișinău
Moldovan male boxers
Light-middleweight boxers